Omphalophana antirrhinii is a moth of the family Noctuidae. It is found from southern France through all southern Europe (with the exception of the extreme west of the Iberian Peninsula), Corsica, Sardinia towards northern Iraq, western Iran, Jordan and Israel.

The wingspan is 26–32 mm. Adults are on wing from March to May. There is one generation per year.

The larvae feed on Antirrhinum, Linaria, Cephalaria, Delphinium and Scabiosa species.

Subspecies
Omphalophana antirrhinii antirrhinii
Omphalophana antirrhinii asiatica (Israel,...)

External links

Species info
Fauna Europaea
Lepiforum.de

Cuculliinae
Moths of Europe
Moths of Asia
Moths of the Middle East
Taxa named by Jacob Hübner
Moths described in 1803